"Fool's Gold" is a song recorded by American singer and actress Sofia Carson. It was released as the lead single for her eponymous debut studio album on March 26, 2021, by Hollywood Records.

Background and composition
The song is described as a "dance pop song with soulful funk guitar wraps around a pulsating bass line as her captivating voice sings a melody that embraces and transports you".

On the song Sofia commented that:

"This is the beginning of a story I’m sharing with the world. We meet a girl who’s at the cusp of falling heart-first into a love that feels too good to be true. Before she falls, she can’t seem to quiet that voice in her head that keeps singing ‘are you for real or Fool’s Gold?"

Music video
The music video was released on the same day and was directed by film director Hannah Lux Davis
and explores fire concept, Carson explained that her and the director used the theme to tell a history that is so personal to the singer stating that
“The visual story is all about fire as you guys saw in the video because she’s in a way metaphorically playing with fire in the game of love. The story that I’m telling is so personal, and we kind of created the narrative together. We used the theme of fire in a really fun way to portray a girl who is really fiery within and knows what she wants, but at the same time is also kind of, metaphorically playing with fire."

Credits
Adapted by AllMusic
Sofia Carson – vocals
Trondheim Soloists – strings
Stargate – producer
Yakob – producer
Caleb Hulin – engineer
Kevin KD Davis – mixing
Mikkel Storleer Eriksen – programming
Tor Erik Hermansen – programming
Jakob Rabitsch – programming
Jeff Jones – programming
Anders Larsen – recording, arranger

Charts

References

2021 singles